Ukhnaagiin Khürelsükh (born 14 June 1968), also referred to as Khürelsükh Ukhnaa, is the 6th and current president of Mongolia, beginning his term on 25 June 2021 after winning the 2021 Mongolian presidential election. He was prime minister from October 2017 to January 2021 and was elected to the Parliament of Mongolia four times – in 2000, 2004, 2012 and 2020.

Prior to his premiership, Khürelsükh served in the Mongolian government as Minister for Emergency Situations from 2004 to 2006, Minister for Professional Inspection from 2006 to 2008, and two stints as deputy prime minister between 2014 and 2017. He was the secretary-general of the Mongolian People's Party from 2008 to 2012 and its chairman from 2017 to 2021.

Background 
Khürelsükh was born to a drivers' family on 14 June 1968 in Ulaanbaatar, Mongolia. His father, Ukhnaa, was born in Khentii province, prompting Khürelsükh to take up his father's birthplace as his constituency. On an interview he gave for TV25, Khürelsükh stated that his father met his mother in Govi-Altai province while he was making wells. The couple then moved to the capital Ulaanbaatar, where Khürelsükh was born. Prior to his birth, his father and older sister found a small bronze axe next to a hot spring well, thus prompting the family to name the newborn Khürelsükh, which literally means 'bronze axe'. Khürelsükh has one older brother, one older sister, and two younger brothers, most of whom are also drivers.

Education 
Khürelsükh graduated from the Secondary School No. 2 in 1985. He graduated from the University of Defense in 1989, with a major in political studies. He studied public administration at the Institute of State Administration and Management Development and Law at the National University of Mongolia, from which he graduated in 1994 and 2000 respectively.

Military career 
From 1989 to 1990, Khürelsükh served as a political deputy in the 1152nd Unit of the Mongolian People's Army. He was the first Mongolian military officer to resign from duty to maintain his party membership in 1990 when the government sought to separate party membership from various (public) offices. Khurelsukh has the rank of colonel.

Political career

Beginnings (1989–2000) 
Khürelsükh then went onto work as a political officer at the Central Committee of the Mongolian People's Revolutionary Party in the early 90s, making him one of the youngest officers in the Central Committee. Khürelsükh was appointed as adviser at the MPRP parliamentary group secretariat in 1994. Having worked there until 1996, he further rose through the ranks to become the general director of the Youth Development Center of the MPRP. This stint led him to found the Mongolian Democratic Socialist Youth Federation (MDSYF), now the Social Democracy Mongolian Youth Union, in 1997. He held the position until 2005, which led him to be called the leader to the party’s so-called “youth faction”. 

Khürelsükh caught the public's attention in the 1990s by organizing demonstrations and hunger strikes in opposition to ongoing political situations at that time.

Rising through the political ranks (2000–2016) 
In 2000, Khürelsükh ran for member of parliament, winning and serving two consecutive terms in the State Great Khural. While serving his second terms as Member of Parliament, Khürelsükh was appointed Minister of Emergency Situations in 2004-2006 and Minister of Professional Inspection in 2006-2008. In 2007 he founded the Left-wing Association of Mongolia, an NGO that supports the Mongolian People's Party. The majority of the founding members were activists in the MDSYF, who have 'aged-out' from the party youth wing.  

Khürelsükh was also successful within his party, having been elected to the Governing Board of the Mongolian People's Revolutionary Party, for eight years starting from 2000. In 2008 he was unanimously voted the Secretary-General of the Party. Khürelsükh served as the Secretary-General until 2012, when he resigned.

In 2012, Khürelsükh was elected Member of Parliament for a third time. He was appointed the Deputy Prime Minister of Mongolia in 2013, serving in this role for four years until his appointment as Prime Minister of Mongolia in 2017. He was awarded the United Nations Champion for Disaster Risk Reduction in 2017.

Prime Minister of Mongolia (2017–2021) 
Mongolia's parliament confirmed the nomination of Khürelsükh as the 30th Prime Minister of Mongolia in October 2017. Khürelsükh succeeded Jargaltulgyn Erdenebat, who was voted out of office in September 2017 amid allegations of corruption and incompetence. During his confirmation hearing, the new prime minister stated “My cabinet... will declare justice again,” and, added, “don’t come to me with illegal acts as well as my cabinet members and don’t pressure us to act illegally.”

One of Khürelsükh's largest projects is the oil refinery plant in Dornogobi province of Mongolia. The oil refinery, established with support from India, will be capable of processing 1.5 million tonnes of crude oil per year, or 30,000 barrels per day, which will be enough to cover domestic needs. 

He has made significant contributions to Mongolia's foreign relations. In April 2018, during an official visit to China, Khürelsükh signed 11 bilateral agreements worth $450 million, including a pact for economic and technological cooperation worth 2 billion yuan ($315 million).

The Prime Minister's visit to the United States of America in September 2018 elevated the cooperation levels between the two countries to expanded comprehensive partnership. This paved the way for Mongolia and the US to become strategic partners a year later. During the historic visit Khürelsükh met the Secretary of State Michael Pompeo to ink the $350 million Millennium Challenge Corporation Mongolia Water Compact.  

He has also served as a mediator between Japan and North Korea. Khürelsükh made an official visit to Japan in December 2018 and met Prime Minister Shinzo Abe to reiterate close bilateral cooperation as part of a Japan-Mongolia Summit Meeting. Following the summit meeting the signing of the “Memorandum of Cooperation Between the Ministry of the Environment of Japan and the Ministry of Environment and Tourism of Mongolia on Environmental Cooperation” took place in the presence of the two leaders, and a Japan-Mongolia joint statement and fact sheet for the “Japan-Mongolia Mid-term Action Plan for a Strategic Partnership” were also issued. The two sides also discussed about the New Ulaanbaatar International Airport.

Khürelsükh has also contributed to bilateral relations with South Korea, choosing South Korea as one of his first official trips abroad. In January 2018, Khürelsükh spent three days in South Korea, accompanied by 7 cabinet ministers, and met with the President of South Korea Moon Jae-in and the Prime Minister of South Korea Lee Nak-yon.

Khürelsükh represented the Mongolian Government at the 73rd session of the United Nations General Assembly, addressing the General debate to raise issues such as inequality, human rights, and climate change.

A little over a year after he was appointed, Khürelsükh survived a no confidence vote amid a corruption scandal implicating high-level politicians. In a council meeting the previous month, Khürelsükh demanded that several high-ranking officials step down for various reasons, including incompetence, resulting in the vote to oust him from office.

Khürelsükh led his Mongolian People's Party to a landslide victory in the parliamentary election on 24 June, 2020. In his election campaign, he noted that Mongolia would become an energy independent country from Russia. He and his party are credited for having successfully reduced air pollution in the country's capital, championing the Constitutional reform, and keeping the country relatively safe from the Covid-19 pandemic. However, he resigned from his post on 21 January 2021, citing street protests against public health service shortcomings. Khürelsükh continued to serve as member of parliament, representing Khentii province in the State Great Khural.

Party roles 

Khürelsükh started his political career as a political officer at the Central Committee of the Mongolian People's Revolutionary Party (MPRP) in 1991. Between 1994 and 1996, he worked as an adviser of the secretariat of the MPRP's fraction in the Parliament of Mongolia. 
He was one of the leading figures within the party to initiate and implement the institutional reforms of the youth organization of the Mongolian People's Revolutionary Party. He established the Mongolian Democratic Socialist Youth Federation by MPRP and served as President two times – between 1997 and 1999 and in 2000–2005. 
In 2000, he was elected to the Governing Board of MPRP, which is the core decision-making body of MPRP. 
In 2008, Khürelsükh was elected as Secretary General of MPRP.
In 2010, under the leadership of Sükhbaataryn Batbold, Chairman of MPRP and in cooperation with similar-minded party colleagues, Khürelsükh championed the process of restoring the original name of the party – Mongolian People's Party, which was changed to "Mongolian People's Revolutionary Party" in 1924 by the recommendation of Comintern in order to demonstrate the solidarity with socialist parties at that time.

2021 Presidential campaign 
On May 2, the Mongolian People's Party nominated Khürelsükh as its candidate for the presidential election on June 9. Khurelsukh was unanimously chosen during the MPP's conference virtually held in Ulaanbaatar on Sunday. On May 24, Khürelsükh started his official campaign from his home province of Khentii. Ahead of the election, Khurelsukh was polled as the most popular politician in the country.

Presidency (2021–present)

Inauguration
He was inaugurated on 25 June 2021 at 11:40 am in the Great Hall of the State Palace. Preceding the ceremony, Khurelsukh, accompanied by his spouse, paid respects to the Statue of Chinggis Khaan.

Ceremonial public actions 
On 4 July 2021, he attended the first flight during the opening ceremony of Chinggis Khaan International Airport.

Presidential appointees 
On 25 June, Khurelsukh issued a decree on appointing Y. Sodbaatar as the Chief of Staff of the Office of the President and Jadambyn Enkhbayar as the Secretary of the National Security Council. Khurelsukh also issued an order on 28 June appointing the following advisor posts:
 A. Byambajargal – Advisor on Legal Policy
 B. Davaadalai – Advisor on Economic Policy
 E. Odbayar – Advisor on Foreign Policy
 D. Bum-Ochir – Advisor on Cultural and Religious Policy
 C. Lodoiravsal – Advisor on Technological Policy

Summary list of high government/party positions 

 President of Mongolia (2021–present)
 Commander-in-Chief of the Mongolian Armed Forces (2021–present)
 Prime Minister of Mongolia (2017–2021)
 Deputy Prime Minister of Mongolia (2016–2017)
 Secretary-General of the Mongolian People's Party (2008–2012)
 Minister for Professional Inspection (2006–2008)
 Minister for Emergency Situations (2004–2006)

 Head of the Social Democracy Mongolian Youth Union (1997–2004)

Personal life 
Khürelsükh is married and has two daughters. His wife is a kindergarten teacher, while his eldest daughter is a human rights lecturer at a university. He enjoys playing guitar with his band called 'Pals', which was formed when he turned 50. The former Prime minister is also an avid motorbike fan, founding the Harley-Davidson fan club in Mongolia.

See also 
 Cabinet of Ukhnaagiin Khürelsükh

References

|-

1968 births
Living people
Deputy Prime Ministers of Mongolia
Mongolian People's Party politicians
National University of Mongolia alumni
People from Ulaanbaatar
Presidents of Mongolia
Prime Ministers of Mongolia
21st-century Mongolian politicians